Globe Building may refer to:

 Globe Building (Saint Paul), the headquarters of the former Saint Paul Globe newspaper that was located in downtown Saint Paul, Minnesota, United States
 Globe Building (Minneapolis), a building that was in downtown Minneapolis, Minnesota that was also associated with the Saint Paul Globe
 Globe Building, Beebe Building and Hotel Cecil, located in downtown Seattle, Washington, United States
 William H. Wright Building, a razed building in downtown Toronto, Ontario, Canada that was home to The Globe and Mail and was a notable example of Streamline Moderne architecture
 Globe Building (St. Louis), the home of the former St. Louis Globe-Democrat and now an office and data center building in downtown St. Louis, Missouri, United States